The Atkinson–Stiglitz theorem is a theorem of public economics which states that "where the utility function is separable between labor and all commodities, no indirect taxes need be employed." Non-linear income taxation can be used by the government and was developed in a seminal article by Joseph Stiglitz and Anthony Atkinson in 1976. The Atkinson–Stiglitz theorem is generally considered to be one of the most important theoretical results in public economics and spawned a broad literature which delimited the conditions under which the theorem holds, e.g. Saez (2002) which showed that the Atkinson–Stiglitz theorem does not hold if households have heterogeneous rather than homogeneous preferences. In practice the Atkinson–Stiglitz theorem has often been invoked in the debate on optimal capital income taxation: Because capital income taxation can be interpreted as the taxation of future consumption in excess of the taxation of present consumption, the theorem implies that governments should abstain from capital income taxation if non-linear income taxation is an option since capital income taxation would not improve equity by comparison to the non-linear income tax, while additionally distorting savings.

Optimal taxation

 
To maximise the utility function, the first order condition is:
   
The government maximises the social welfare function, and so 
   
Then we use a density function  to express the Hamiltonian: 
  

Then the following relation holds:
  
Substituting this relation into the above condition yields:

and we obtain 

Note that there is no loss of generality in setting  zero, therefore we put . Since , we have 

Thus it turns out that no indirect taxation need to be employed, i.e. , provided that the utility function is weakly separable between labour and all consumption goods.

Other approach
Joseph Stiglitz explains why indirect taxation is unnecessary, viewing the Atkinson-Stiglitz theorem from a different perspective.

Basic concepts
Suppose that those who are in category 2 are the more able. Then, for Pareto efficient taxation at which a government aims, 
we impose two conditions. The first condition is that the utility of category 1 is equal to or more than a given level:

The second condition is that the government revenue , which is equal to or more than the revenue requirement , is increased by a given amount: 

where  and  indicate the number of individuals of each type. Under these conditions, the government needs to maximise the utility  of category 2. Then writing down the Lagrange function for this problem:

which ensures satisfaction of the self-selection constraints, we obtain the first order conditions:

 
 
and we find that the marginal tax rate for category 2 is zero. And as to category 1, we have

Also, we have the following expression: 
  
where we denote  by
 
Therefore, by assumption,  and so we can directly prove that . Accordingly, we find that the marginal tax rate for category 1 is positive.

The lump-sum tax imposed on an individual of category 1 would become larger than that for category 2, if the lump-sum tax were feasible.

Various commodities
Now we need to consider a case where income level and several commodities are observals. Each individual's consumption function is expressed in a vector form as       

In this case, the government's budget constraint is
  
Then we have 

It follows that 
 
Suppose all individuals have the same indifference curve in C-L plane. The separability between leisure and consumption enables us to have  which yields 
  
As a result, we obtain
  
Thus we find that it is unnecessary to impose taxes on commodities.

Conditions for randomization
We need to consider a case where high ability individuals (who usually earn more money to show their ability) pretend to be like they are not more able. In this case, it could be argued that the government needs to randomize the taxes imposed on the low ability individuals, for the purpose of increasing the effectiveness of screening. It is possible that under certain conditions we can do the randomization of the taxes without damaging the low ability individuals, and therefore we discuss the conditions. The randomization is done so that the risk of the former case should differ from that of the latter. 

To avoid hitting the low ability group, the mean consumption must be shifted upwards at each . As the comsumption is maximized, a higher  is set for a higher . Then the relations between those variables are         

and likewise 

And accordingly we have
  

Then we have

where .
. Also we define  by 
.

    

Then we have 
   

Since , we obtain the condition under which randomization is desirable:

See also
 Redistribution of wealth
 Pareto optimality

References 

Public economics